Robin Weirauch (born January 3, 1957) is an American politician of the Democratic party who was the party's 2004 and 2006 nominee to challenge incumbent Republican U.S. Representative Paul Gillmor for the seat in Ohio's 5th congressional district.

She is the daughter of a retired Master Staff Sergeant in the United States Air Force and has resided in the 5th District since her elementary school days and is married to her husband of 30 years, Bruce Weirauch, a retired Napoleon, Ohio police lieutenant.

Weirauch is a public administrator who formerly served as an Assistant Director at the Center For Regional Development at Bowling Green State University in Bowling Green, Ohio. She holds an MPA in Public Administration from there and cites various other credentials as well.

Weirauch's campaign team toured the geographically large district in a retired ambulance decorated with her, "CPR - Caring Personal Representation", slogan.

Weirauch lost the 2006 election, receiving 43% of the vote. Gillmor was re-elected but died during the term, on September 5, 2007.

Prior to Gillmor's death, Weirauch wrote several letters published in the Toledo Blade, criticizing Rep. Gillmor for supposedly living outside the district with only a token address within the district so that he could claim residency.

On September 20, 2007, Weirauch announced her candidacy for the vacant Fifth District seat in the U.S. House of Representatives with a video released on YouTube.com. She won the Democratic Primary on November 6, 2007 and faced Republican Bob Latta in the general election on December 11, 2007. She lost the election to the GOP candidate.

In 2008, she ran for Henry County Commissioner in the November election against Republican incumbent Bob Hastedt. Henry County, Ohio is a largely Republican leaning county (it voted for McCain over Obama by 1,900 votes), and Weirauch lost the election for commissioner by a large margin.

Election results

2007 US House, Ohio District 5 Special Election

Democratic Primary Election, November 6

General Election, December 11

2006 US House, Ohio District 5

2004 US House, Ohio District 5

References

External links
Open Congress

1957 births
Living people
Ohio Democrats
Politicians from Dayton, Ohio
Bowling Green State University alumni